Rear Admiral Peter Michael Quinn  is a senior officer in the Royal Australian Navy. He has served as Head of Navy Capability from 2017 to 2022.

Naval career
Quinn joined the navy in 1963. His seagoing role has been as a warfare officer on frigates and destroyers in the Royal Australian Navy and on exchange with the Royal Canadian Navy. He commanded the HMAS Sydney from 2003 to 2006 and the HMAS Anzac 2009 to 2010. Shore appointments included Officer in Charge Maritime Warfare Training Group, Head of Combat Systems Training, Director Maritime Combat Development, Director General Navy Capability Transition and Sustainment, Head Joint Capability Coordination, Head Joint Capability Management and Integration, Head Force Integration and his current position as Head Navy Capability.

He was awarded a Conspicuous Service Cross for outstanding achievement as the Commanding Officer of HMAS Sydney in the 2007 Australia Day Honours.

He became a Member of the Order of Australia in the 2018 Queen's Birthday Honours for exceptional service to the Royal Australian Navy and Defence in senior management.*AM

He was promoted to Officer of the Order of Australia in the 2023 Australia Day Honours.

References

Living people
Officers of the Order of Australia
Recipients of the Conspicuous Service Cross (Australia)
Royal Australian Navy admirals
Year of birth missing (living people)